Mutanda is a town in Kalumbila District, North-Western Province, Zambia.

Population
, the population of Mutanda is estimated to be about 2,000 people.

Landmarks
In Mutanda, or near its borders, there are the following landmarks:

 Mutanda Evangelical Mission
 Mutanda Mini Hydropower Station - 2kW
 Mutanda Electricity Utility Company
 The junction of Chingola-Ikelenge Highway (T5 Road) with the Zambezi-Mutanda Highway (M8 Road)
 River Mutanda - The river runs through the town, dividing it into East Mutanda and West Mutanda.
 Mutanda Hospital
 Mutanda High School - Mixed, residential high school
 Mutanda Primary School - Mixed, elementary non-residential school

External links
 Mutanda Mini Hydropower Project

References

Populated places in North-Western Province, Zambia